Soulful Symphony is a 75-piece American symphony orchestra founded in 2000 by composer Darin Atwater, who serves as the symphony's artistic director and conductor. The symphony is based in Baltimore, Maryland and its membership is predominantly African American and Latino. The Soulful Symphony performs classical, jazz, gospel, and popular music.

External links
Soulful Symphony official site
City Paper article
NPR story
Avis Thomas-Lester, "Trumpeting Diversity", The Washington Post, Tuesday, May 22, 2007, p.B01

2000 establishments in Maryland
African-American history in Baltimore
African-American musical groups
Hispanic and Latino American culture in Baltimore
Musical groups established in 2000
Musical groups from Baltimore
Orchestras based in Maryland